WBXE (93.7 FM, "Rock 93.7") is a radio station broadcasting a mainstream rock format. Licensed to Baxter, Tennessee, United States, the station serves the Cookeville area. The station is currently owned by JWC Broadcasting.

References

External links

BXE
Mainstream rock radio stations in the United States
Putnam County, Tennessee